Andrey Anatolyevich Zaliznyak (29 April 1935 – 24 December 2017) was a Soviet and Russian linguist, an expert in historical linguistics, accentology, dialectology and grammar. Doctor of Philological Sciences (1965, while defending his Candidate thesis). In his later years he paid much attention to popularization of linguistics and the struggle against pseudoscience.

Biography 
Zaliznyak was born in Moscow and studied in the Moscow University before moving to the Sorbonne to further his studies with André Martinet. He was admitted into the Soviet Academy of Sciences as a corresponding member in 1987. Ten years later, he was elected a full academician.

Zaliznyak's first monograph, Russian Nominal Inflection (1967), remains a definitive study in the field. Ten years later, he published a highly authoritative Grammatical Dictionary of the Russian Language, which went through several reprints and provided a basis for Russian grammar software.

In 1982, Zaliznyak turned his interests towards the birch bark scrolls which have been unearthed in Novgorod since the 1950s. He has co-edited all publications of newly discovered birch scrolls since 1986. As the number of these ancient documents exceeded 700, Zaliznyak summed up his findings in the monograph Old Novgorod dialect (1995), which comprised the texts and comments of every birch scroll discovered. In particular, he demonstrated how the phonetics of the Old Novgorod dialect can be reconstructed from the typos in the birch scrolls.

In 2003, Zaliznyak published the first comprehensive study of the Novgorod Codex, the earliest extant East Slavic book, which had been sensationally discovered three years earlier.

In 2004, he published a study of the Tale of Igor's Campaign which examined all the significant linguistic arguments concerning its authenticity. Zaliznyak contends that no 20th-century (let alone 18th-century) forger could have reproduced the grammatical subtleties of the 12th-century Old East Slavic language.

Zaliznyak lectured in the Moscow University, University of Geneva, and University of Paris. For more data on his work, see Old Novgorod dialect, Novgorod Codex, and the Tale of Igor's Campaign.

Honors 

 1997: Demidov Prize
 2007: State Prize of the Russian Federation
 2007: Solzhenitsyn Prize
 2007: Lomonosov Gold Medal
 2015: , for his work, Древнерусское ударение: общие сведения и словарь

Major works 
 Andrey Zaliznyak. Russkoe imennoe slovoizmenenie. Moskva, 1967.
 Andrey Zaliznyak. Grammaticheskij slovar' russkogo jazyka. Moskva, 1977, (further editions are 1980, 1987, 2003).
 Andrey Zaliznyak. Grammaticheskij ocherk sanskrita. Appendix to Russian-Sanscrit dictionnary, ed. by V.A. Kochergina, Moskva, 1978.
 Andrey Zaliznyak. Drevnenovgorodskij dialekt. Jazyki slavjanskoj kul'tury: Moskva. 2004.
 Andrey Zaliznyak. About Faux Linguistics and Quasihistory

References

External links
 А. А. Зализняк на сайте  Института славяноведения РАН 
 Андрей Анатольевич Зализняк. Биографическая справка
 Pavel Iosad, Maria Koptjevskaja-Tamm, Alexander Piperski and Dmitri Sitchinava (2018) "Depth, brilliance, clarity: Andrey Anatolyevich Zaliznyak (1935–2017)" (Obituary). Linguistic Typology 2018; 22(1): 175–184.

1935 births
2017 deaths
Writers from Moscow
Russian people of Ukrainian descent
Slavists
Linguists from Russia
Linguists from the Soviet Union
20th-century linguists
Grammarians from Russia
Linguists of Russian
21st-century linguists
University of Paris alumni
Corresponding Members of the USSR Academy of Sciences
Full Members of the Russian Academy of Sciences
State Prize of the Russian Federation laureates
Demidov Prize laureates
Solzhenitsyn Prize winners
Recipients of the Lomonosov Gold Medal